Furcula occidentalis, the western furcula moth, double-lined furcula or willow kitten , is a moth of the  family Notodontidae. It is found from southern Yukon and British Columbia to Nova Scotia, south to Maryland and west to Utah and Oregon.

The wingspan is 32–45 mm. The forewings are pale greyish with a dark grey median band and a dark grey patch. The hindwings are pale greyish-white with a black-dotted terminal line and a dark discal spot. Adults are on wing from April to August in one to two generations per year.

The larvae feed on Salix and sometimes Populus species. Larvae can be found from June to September. The species overwinters in the pupal stage.

References

Moths described in 1878
Taxa named by Joseph Albert Lintner
Notodontidae
Moths of North America